Nanette Inventor (born 1954) is a comedian, actress, singer, composer and writer from the Philippines.

Early life
Agnes Inventor was born on June 23, 1954, in Manila, capital of the Philippines. She had two sisters and a brother. She studied at the University of the Philippines Diliman with the intention of joining the diplomatic service of the Philippines. Starting singing in church at the age of seven and trained in classical singing, she continued while at university. She went on the 1974 and 1978 tours of the University of the Philippines Concert Chorus (UPCC) to the US and Europe, together with other future stars, such as Chinggoy Alonso. In joining the chorus, she disobeyed her lawyer father, who warned her there was no money in singing.

Career
Initially a jingle singer and a backing vocalist for Celeste Legaspi, Basil Valdez, and Leah Navarro, among others, Inventor was discovered by a television producer who saw her performing in a musical and enjoyed her humour. The story goes that she was given a script and told that she would be performing live on television that week. She became famous playing a character called Doña Buding, a gauche, nouveau riche social climber, on the television show, The Penthouse Live!, premiering in the role on November 14, 1983. Not the original choice for the role, she got the job when the first choice was injured in a road accident and she was recommended by another actress, Tessie Tomas.

Although she continued singing, winning the grand prize at the 7th Metro Manila Popular Music Festival in 1984, and becoming the first Filipina to sing at Carnegie Hall in New York City, alongside the all-male APO Hiking Society, she became better known as a comedian. Doing stand-up shows she blended comedy with music, earning her the title "The Funny Lady of Songs". However, in 2012, she joined the UPCC on its golden anniversary tour of the US, and in June and July 2016 she joined it again for another tour in the US. Also in 2016, she sang with a Big band for the first time. 

Inventor is a frequent performer of stand-up and music shows in the Philippines and the US, usually to Filipino audiences. She has appeared in many films and in television series. She is also a university lecturer, teaching communication skills at the Philippine Christian University in Ermita, Manila since around 2000 and also teaching at the Wesleyan University Philippines.

TV Series
2021. Niña Niño 
2015. Relationship 
2015. On the Wings of Love
2014. My Destiny 
2010. Panday Kids 
2010. Ang Yaman ni Lola (Starring role)
2009. Flash Bomba
2008. Dyesebel
1991. Abangan Ang Susunod Na Kabanata
1982. The Penthouse Live! (Starring role)

Films
2021. General Admission
2017. Ang Larawan
2015. Buy Now, Die Later
2015. Miss Bulalacao 
2008. Ikaw Pa Rin: Bongga Ka Boy 
2007. One More Chance
1998. Honey, Nasa Langit na ba ako?
1995. Run Barbi Run 
1982. Batch '81 
1980. Kakabakaba Ka Ba? (Are You Nervous?)

References

1954 births
Living people
Filipino film actresses
20th-century Filipino women singers
Filipino women comedians
University of the Philippines Diliman alumni
Filipino television actresses
Actors from Manila
GMA Network personalities
ABS-CBN personalities
TV5 (Philippine TV network) personalities